The  is a railway line in Ibaraki Prefecture, Japan, operated by the private railway operator Kantō Railway. It is a non-electrified line which connects Toride to Shimodate.

The Jōsō Line connects with the Tsukuba Express line, which opened in 2005, at Moriya Station, the only interchange other than at its two termini.

In fiscal 1999, the Jōsō Line carried an annual total of 14.16 million passengers (38,000 per day), making it the busiest non-electrified private line in Japan.

Stations

Rolling stock
 KiHa 0 series (ex-JNR KiHa 20) 
 KiHa 100 series (driver-only-operation version of KiHa 300)
 KiHa 300 series (ex-JNR KiHa 30)
 KiHa 310 series (ex-JNR KiHa 16/17)
 KiHa 350 series (ex-JNR KiHa 30/35/36) (1987–2012)
 KiHa 2100 series (introduced 1993)
 KiHa 2200 series (introduced 1997)
 KiHa 2300 series (introduced 2000)
 KiHa 2400 series (introduced 2004)
 KiHa 5000 series (introduced 2009)
 KiHa 5010 series (from February 2017)

History
The Jōsō Railway opened the line on 1 November 1913. In 1945, the company merged with the Tsukuba Railway to form the Jōsō Tsukuba Railway, which merged with the Kanto Railway in 1965.

Originally all single-track,  of the line was doubled between Toride and Mitsukaidō by 15 November 1984.

References
This article incorporates material from the corresponding article in the Japanese Wikipedia.

Hisakyu's Railway Guide (Go to "North Kanto" and "Kanto Railway").

Kantō Railway
Railway lines opened in 1913
1067 mm gauge railways in Japan
1913 establishments in Japan